Bahrain competed at the 1988 Summer Olympics in Seoul, South Korea. Seven competitors, all men, took part in seven events in three sports.

Competitors
The following is the list of number of competitors in the Games.

Athletics

Men

Track events

Fencing

Four fencers, all men, represented Bahrain in 1988.

Modern pentathlon

Three male pentathletes represented Bahrain in 1988.

Men

Taekwondo

Men

References

External links
Official Olympic Reports

Nations at the 1988 Summer Olympics
1988
Summer Olympics